Georg Adelly (19 October 1919 – 26 October 1997) was a Swedish film actor. He appeared in 34 films between 1948 and 1984.

Selected filmography
 Loffe as a Millionaire (1948)
 Father Bom (1949)
 Knockout at the Breakfast Club (1950)
 A Ghost on Holiday (1951)
 The Green Lift (1952)
 Say It with Flowers (1952)
 Sju svarta be-hå (1954)
 Far och flyg (1955)
 The Minister of Uddarbo (1957)
 More Than a Match for the Navy (1958)
 Åsa-Nisse as a Policeman (1960)
 Harry Munter (1969)
 Rasmus på luffen (1981)

References

External links

1919 births
1997 deaths
People from Gjøvik
Swedish male film actors
20th-century Swedish male actors